Christian Delle Stelle (born 4 February 1989) is an Italian former professional racing cyclist.

Major results

2009
 1st Giro del Medio Brenta
2011
 2nd Circuito del Porto
2013
 8th RideLondon–Surrey Classic
2014
 1st GP Izola
 1st Trofeo Franco Balestra
 Okolo Slovenska
1st Points classification
1st Stage 4
 2nd Gran Premio Nobili Rubinetterie
 2nd Grand Prix Sarajevo
2015
 10th Münsterland Giro

References

External links
 

1989 births
Living people
Italian male cyclists
Cyclists from the Metropolitan City of Milan
People from Cuggiono